Kevin Franck (born 10 June 1982 in Aalst) is a retired Belgian football player.

Career
He gained some notability for being a Belgian footballer to have played for Real Madrid, even though he never made it to the first team.

In the 2006-07 in Belgian football, he became second division champions with Dender, thus achieving promotion to the highest level of Belgian football. As Franck wasn't already certain of his place in the first team, he was transferred to KVSK United, who see him as the successor of former Anderlecht player Philip Haagdoren, who has now become KVSK United's coach.

Franck was transferred to Eendracht Aalst in the summer of 2008, after one year signed in June 2009 for KSV Oudenaarde.

References

1982 births
Living people
Association football midfielders
Belgian footballers
Belgian expatriate footballers
Real Madrid Castilla footballers
RCD Mallorca players
K.A.A. Gent players
F.C.V. Dender E.H. players
S.C. Eendracht Aalst players
Lommel S.K. players
Challenger Pro League players
Belgian expatriate sportspeople in Spain
Expatriate footballers in Spain
Sportspeople from Aalst, Belgium
Footballers from East Flanders
K.R.C. Gent players